Among the Cinders is a 1983 New Zealand drama film directed by Rolf Hädrich and starring Paul O'Shea, Amanda Jones, Derek Hardwick and Yvonne Lawley. After a hunting accident in which his friend is killed (for which he blames himself) a boy (Nick) runs away from home and goes to live with his grandparents, where he matures into a man.

The film is based on the 1965 novel of the same name by New Zealand author Maurice Shadbolt, who appears in the film as Frank Flinders.

Premise
Nick Flinders is a lonely and moody youth.  The one friend he has is a Maori boy, Sam Waikai.  While they are hunting together in the bush, Sam is accidentally killed.  Nick is injured, but he feels guilty and responsible for his friend's death.  With the help of his eccentric grandfather, Nick learns about life and love.

Cast
 Paul O'Shea ...  Nick Flinders 
 Amanda Jones ...  Glenys Appleby
 Derek Hardwick ...  Hubert Flinders, grandfather 
 Yvonne Lawley ...  Beth Flinders, grandmother 
 Rebecca Gibney ...  Sally 
 Bridget Armstrong ...  Helga Flinders, mother 
 Maurice Shadbolt ...  Frank Flinders 
 Marcus Broughton ...  Derek Flinders
 Christopher Hansard ...  Michael 
 Ricky Duff ...  Sam Waikai
 Harata Solomon ...  Mrs. Waikai 
 Michael Haigh ...  Sergeant Crimmins 
 Peter Baldock ...  Clergyman 
 Cherie O'Shea ...  Nurse 
 Tom Poata ...  Ahu 
 Ngaire Woods ... Kate 
 Des Kelly ... Fred
 Sal Criscillo ... Photographer 
 Sela Apera ... Tera 
 Helena Ross ... Glenys' mother
 Tamata Paua Bailey ... Māori orator 
 Lorna Langford ... Postmistress 
 David Hamilton ... Photograpjher's assistant 
 Ken Nicholas ... Golfer 
 Lil and Puti Te Runa ... Golfer's family
 Cindy Turipa ... Sam's sister 
 Shelley Simpson ... model 
 Jill Ann Davis ... model

Production and screening  
 
The film was made in 1983, but not submitted to the New Zealand censor until 1987. It has screened on New Zealand television and often on German television. It was shown at the 1984 Karlovy Vary Film Festival, Czechoslovakia, and Derek Hardwick got a Special Jury Prize.

References 
New Zealand Film 1912-1996 by Helen Martin & Sam Edwards (1997, Oxford University Press, Auckland)

External links

 Among the Cinders at the BFI Database

1983 films
1980s New Zealand films
1983 drama films
New Zealand drama films
West German films
English-language German films
Films directed by Rolf Hädrich
1980s English-language films